The Lieser is a small river in Rhineland-Palatinate, Germany, a left tributary of the Moselle. It rises in the Eifel, near Boxberg, north of Daun. The Lieser flows south through Daun, Manderscheid and Wittlich. It flows into the Moselle west of the village of Lieser.

See also 
List of rivers of Rhineland-Palatinate

References 

Rivers of Rhineland-Palatinate
Rivers of the Eifel
Rivers of Germany